Nicole Jacques-Lefevre, also known as Nicole Jacques-Chaquin, is a Professor of Literature at the University of Picardie Jules Verne who specialises in the study of demonological texts of the Enlightenment in the eighteenth century including werewolves and lycanthropy.

In 1990, with Maxime Preaud, she produced a critical edition of Jean de Nynauld's 1615 work, De la lycanthropie, transformation et extase des sorciers (On lycanthropy, transformation and ecstasy of witches). (Frenesie, Paris, 1990. )

Selected publications
Les sorciers du carroi de Marlou: Un procès de sorcellerie en Berry, 1582-1583. Grenoble: J. Millon, 1996.  (With Maxime Préaud)
Louis-Claude de Saint-Martin, le philosophe inconnu (1743-1803). Paris: Dervy, 2003. 
Écriture, identité, anonymat au XVIIIe siècle. Nanterre: Université Paris X-Nanterre, 2006.  (With Marie Leca-Tsiomis)

References

Academic staff of the University of Picardy Jules Verne
Living people
Year of birth missing (living people)